Coleophora physophorae is a moth of the family Coleophoridae. It is found in southern Russia and central Asia. It occurs in desert-steppe biotopes.

Adults are on wing from late April to May.

The larvae feed on the carpels of Suaeda physophora.

References

physophorae
Moths of Asia
Moths described in 1994